Eulimella similebala is a species of sea snails, a marine gastropod mollusc in the family Pyramidellidae, the pyrams and their allies.

Notes
Additional information regarding this species:
 Habitat: Known from seamounts and knolls
 European waters (ERMS scope)

References

 Gofas, S.; Le Renard, J.; Bouchet, P. (2001). Mollusca, in: Costello, M.J. et al. (Ed.) (2001). European register of marine species: a check-list of the marine species in Europe and a bibliography of guides to their identification. Collection Patrimoines Naturels, 50: pp. 180–213
 Peñas A. & Rolán E., 1999. Pyramidellidae (Gastropoda, Heterostropha) de la misión oceanográfica "Seamount 2". Iberus suplemento 5: 151-199

External links
 To Encyclopedia of Life
 To World Register of Marine Species

similebala
Gastropods described in 2014